The 2017 V de V Endurance Series was the third consecutive season for the GT, Touring Car and LMP3 classes of the V de V sanctioned series.

Entry list

PFV

LMP3

GTV1

GTV2

Race calendar and results

Bold indicates overall winner.

References

V de V Endurance Series